The grey-breasted brown dove (Phapitreron amethystinus maculipectus) is a subspecies of amethyst brown dove in the family Columbidae. It is endemic to the Philippines being found in Negros and Panay. Its natural habitats are or tropical moist lowland forests and tropical moist montane forests. It is found in lowlands but probably prefers middle and high elevations at 500-2000m. It is most often seen singly or in pairs, in and around fruiting trees. The call is a deep, sonorous "hoot-hoot-hoot-hoot", and birds may sit and call for long periods.

Description 
It is differentiated from the amethyst brown dove in Luzon (amethystinus subspecies) and Mindanao (imeldae subspecies) with is light grey breast and overall lighter appearance. It also has a longer bill and pink legs. The HBW and BirdLife International Illustrated Checklist of the Birds of the World considers it as a separate species  Phapitreron maculipectus.

Conservation status 
The dove is considered rare in its range. Negros is one of the most deforested islands in the country and is only found in the remnant forests. Range in Panay has not been fully surveyed but they may persist in larger numbers. IUCN estimates the population to be 2,500 to 9,999 mature individuals.  Threats include habitat loss and hunting for both food and the exotic pet trade.

References

Further reading
 Baptista, L.F., Trail, P.W., Horblit, H.M., Kirwan, G.M. and E.F.J. Garcia. 2017. Amethyst Brown-dove (Phapitreron amethystinus). In: del Hoyo, J., Elliott, A., Sargatal, J., Christie, D.A. & de Juana, E. (eds.). Handbook of the Birds of the World Alive. Lynx Edicions, Barcelona, retrieved from: http://www.hbw.com/node/54284
 Constantino, A. 2011. A calling amethyst brown-dove [HD]. Retrieved from Birding Adventure Philippines: http://www.birdingphilippines.com/2011/10/13/a-calling-amethyst-brown-dove-hd/
 McGregor, R. C. 1909. A manual of Philippine birds (Vol. 2). Ripol Classic Publishing House.

Phapitreron
Birds described in 1894
Taxa named by Frank Swift Bourns
Taxa named by Dean Conant Worcester